Brodac Gornji is a small village located north of the city of Bijeljina in Republika Srpska, Bosnia and Herzegovina.

Sports
Local football club Jedinstvo play in Bosnia and Herzegovina's third tier-Second League of the Republika Srpska. Their host their home games at the Stadion RIBIN Brodac.

References

External links
 Bijeljina official website (Serbian)

Bijeljina
Populated places in Bijeljina